Astrakhan State University (formerly Astrakhan State Pedagogical University) is a university located in Astrakhan, Russian Federation. It was founded in 1932. 

The traditional functions of Astrakhan State University include training specialists and fundamental researches; but ASU also works actively to export its educational services and to share new technologies with the industry and the business.

ASU in figures:
 6 Institutions;
 21 Departments;
 82 Chairs;
 More than 40 research institutions, centers, and laboratories;
 More than 100 specialties to train students;
 57 research specialties for PhD courses;
 11 thesis councils;
 More than 16, 000 students (including more than 500 foreigners);
 600 postgraduate students (including 23 foreigners);
 10 university buildings for studies;
 6 comfortable hostels;
 37 computer centers with Internet access.

ASU actively develops its international links. Jointly with its partners from Finland, Italy, Japan, Germany, France, China, Iran, Egypt, United States, Uzbekistan, and from other countries, Astrakhan State University carries out the following programs: short-term language courses, student exchanges, joint research and innovative projects, joint courses for students, international conferences.

ASU successfully realizes its agreements on “double diplomas” signed with Université de Sophia Antipolis (France) and with Clark University (Worcester, Massachusetts, USA). The agreements concern joint Masters’ programs.

ASU has been chosen by Harvard University (USA) as a pilot site in Russia to organize an educational program in international competitiveness.

The two-year experience gained by ASU's Russian Language Summer School for American students has made it possible for the parties to sign a cooperation agreement till 2012.

ASU has become one of 16 basic Russian Universities to form the University of the Shanghai Cooperation Organisation.

A UNESCO Chair operates at ASU; this Chair contributes to setting a systematic international cooperation and to enhancing international relations between universities and other organizations.

ASU's students can study the main European (English, German, French, Italian, Spanish, etc.) and Eastern (Persian, Turkish, Arabian, Japanese, Chinese, Korean, etc.) languages.

References

External links 
 Official website

Universities in Volga Region
Universities and institutes established in the Soviet Union
Buildings and structures in Astrakhan Oblast
Educational institutions established in 1932
1932 establishments in the Soviet Union